Weldon Kipkirui Langat (born 24 February 1998) is a Kenyan long-distance runner. He competed in the 10,000 metres at the 2020 Summer Olympics, finishing 20th with a time of 28:41.42.

References

Athletes (track and field) at the 2020 Summer Olympics 
Kenyan male long-distance runners
1998 births
Living people
Olympic athletes of Kenya